The 2015–16 Hamburger SV season was the 128th season in the club's football history. In 2015–16 the club played in the Bundesliga, the top tier of German football. It was the club's 53rd consecutive season in this league, being the only club to have played every season in the Bundesliga since its introduction in 1963.

First team squad 
As of September 2015, according to the official website.

Transfers

In

Out

Competitions

Bundesliga

League table

Results summary

Results by round

Matches

DFB-Pokal

Statistics

Appearances and goals 

|}

References

Hamburger SV seasons
Hamburger SV